This is a list of National Historic Sites of Canada in France.  Canada has designated only two sites outside its borders as National Historic Sites, both of which are war memorials in northern France commemorating Canadian and Newfoundland losses in the First World War.

Similar to the Sites, three National Historic Events have been designated in France, one related to the First World War, and two related to the Second World War. Both Sites and Events (and those for National Historic Persons, as well) are marked using the same style of federal plaque. The markers do not indicate which designation—a Site, Event, or Person—a subject has been given.

This list uses the designation names as recognized by the Historic Sites and Monuments Board of Canada, which may not necessarily be the official or colloquial names of the sites.

National Historic Sites

See also

Military history of Canada during World War I
Canadian war memorials
Monument historique

References

France
Canada
Canada–France relations
 List
Canada history-related lists
France history-related lists